Gunfight in the Valley of Tears, Oct. 9, 1973 is a board game simulating tactical level ground combat between Israel and Syria on the Golan Heights during the 1973 Arab-Israeli War.  The product is intended as a simple game suitable for novices.

Perry Moore in 2003 issued Gunfight in the Valley of Tears in a plastic sleeve with a paper map and unmounted and uncut counters.

Components
480 unmounted and uncut counters representing Israeli and Syrian units and informational pieces; an 11" by 17" hexagon-patterned map, a rulebook, and players' aid sheets.  The game requires but does not include a ten-sided die.

Credits
Game Design: Perry Moore
Game Development: Paul Rohrbaugh, Brian Brennan

Sources
Elusive Victory: The Arab-Israeli Wars, 1947-1974, by Trevor N. Dupuy, Harper and Row, New York, 1978
Arabs at War: Military Effectiveness 1948-1991, by Kenneth M. Pollack, University of Nebraska Press, Lincoln, Nebraska, 2002

External links

Board games introduced in 2003
Yom Kippur War board wargames